The Materials Simulation Laboratory of the Department of Physics, University of South Florida, (MSL) was established in 2002 by Prof. Ivan Oleynik of that University.  The MSL is dedicated to solving challenging problems in condensed matter and materials physics using computers as research tools.

Research efforts at MSL focus on understanding fundamental atomic-scale properties of materials using a wide range of atomic-scale modeling techniques. These methods include first-principles density functional theory, tight-binding, classical interatomic potentials, and molecular dynamics simulations.

Structural, mechanical, electronic, and transport properties of advanced materials such as diamond, silicon, organic thin films and single molecules, metal/oxide and metal/organic interfaces, and  energetic molecular crystals are of particular interest. All the problems addressed have a tight connection with experimental work being performed by MSL collaborators  around the world. Although the dynamical interplay between experiment and theory is the key to success in developing an understanding of the fundamental  physics and chemistry of materials, the goal is to use the powerful arsenal of atomic-scale modeling and analytic techniques to attack the problems that are difficult or impossible to study by experiment. For example, the behavior of matter at extreme conditions such as  shock compression of materials is studied by molecular dynamics which allows us to investigate the phenomena at sub-nanometer length and sub-picosecond time scales. These time and length scales can not be experimentally studied at the same level of detail as done by theory/modeling. Research projects are currently conducted within the following key areas:

Simulations of matter at extreme conditions
Molecular electronics
Spintronics 
Tunneling in condensed matter and molecular systems
Development of methods for large scale simulations of materials

External links
The Materials Simulation Laboratory web site.

University of South Florida
2002 establishments in Florida